Molk-e Daraq is a village in Chahardangeh Rural District, Hurand District, Ahar County, East Azerbaijan Province, Iran. At the 2006 census, its population was 127, in 23 families.

References 

Populated places in Ahar County